The Scrivia,  long, is a right tributary of the river Po, in northern Italy. It runs through Liguria, Piedmont, and Lombardy.

Main tributaries 
 left hand:
 torrente Laccio;
 torrente Busalletta;
 torrente Traversa;
 rio San Rocco;
 right hand:
 torrente Pentemina;
 torrente Brevenna
 torrente Seminella;
 torrente Vobbia;
 torrente Spinti; 
 torrente Borbera;
 torrente Ossona, 
 torrente Grue.

References

Other projects

Rivers of Italy
Rivers of the Province of Alessandria
Rivers of the Province of Genoa
Rivers of the Province of Pavia
Rivers of the Apennines